Florence Jane Short (aka Rachel Peace) (born 25 April 1881 – after 1932) was a British feminist and suffragette, who was imprisoned and force-fed.

Early life 
Florence Jane Short was born in 1881 in Lewisham, the daughter of Mary née Brown (1857-) and Samuel Henry Short (1850–1924), then a labourer. By 1901 her father was a storekeeper for the Metropolitan Board of Works while Jane Short is listed as a shirt machinist. In 1911 she was a masseuse and embroideress in Letchworth in Hertfordshire.

Suffragette activism 

Short was arrested for joining in suffragette activism in Downing Street, in November 1911; in July 1912 for window breaking at Baldock and Hitchin post offices and again for breaking windows at an estate agents in Pall Mall in February 1913.

Then on 4 October 1913, Short was arrested with Mary Richardson near the scene of a mansion house fire (under the name 'Rachel Peace') . At the house 'The Elms', Hampton, evidence of inflammables and a copy of the WSPU publication The Suffragette was found. The women had been caught by police in the early hours, and as Mary was out of prison under the Cat and Mouse Act, Prisoners (Temporary Discharge for Ill Health) Act 1913  to recover from ill health but on  licence to return to serve the rest of their original sentence, when they were both arrested for arson, but refused to identify themselves. At their trial they were informed that if they went on hunger strike, they would be force-fed if needed but were not to be released under the Act, due to their previous dangerous behaviour. Short led her own defence against the cruelty of force feeding and its impact on women's health, and then the audience of women rose up and threw tomatoes and a hammer at windows and at the court officials. The court was cleared whilst 'Rachel Peace' was sentenced to 18 months with hard labour.

During her sentence Short was able to release detailed descriptions of the force-feeding and its physical and mental effect: 'I feel as if I should go mad.'Within a week of this sentence, eight private doctors' practices had their premises' windows broken by missiles wrapped in suffragette materials. And church services at St Paul's Cathedral  and Westminster Abbey were disrupted by large groups of women chanting a loud prayer to God, in favour of Short & Richardson, the cruelty of force-feeding and justice of the cause.

The Bishop of London did visit women in Holloway Prison where they being force-fed and reported that Short (Peace) was pale but not unduly thin or distressed. And while 'Rachel Peace'  was first imprisoned, an explosive attached to the walls shattering windows but no one was found or arrested for the attack.

Short was given a Hunger Strike Medal 'for Valour' (named to Rachel Peace) by the WSPU. Today it is in a private collection.

Short was able to write secretly to Mary Richardson and to Kitty Marion whilst they were all in prison, in pencil using thin brown lavatory paper. She even gave an astrology prediction (relating to fighting and beauty - Mars and Venus) on the latter's birthday.

She suffered terribly while serving her prison sentence and endured force-feeding three times a day, causing her to "lose her reason". On her release from prison she spent the rest of her life in and out of various lunatic asylums at the expense of Lady Constance Bulwer-Lytton.

References 

English suffragettes
1881 births
Year of death missing
Women's Social and Political Union
Hunger Strike Medal recipients

.